Uganda Air Cargo Corporation  (UACC), is an airline based in Kampala, Uganda. It operates scheduled and charter services for both passengers and cargo.

Location
Its main base is located on the 2nd floor of the main airport terminal at Entebbe International Airport. UACC maintains a sales and marketing office on the 3rd Floor, Colline House, Speke Road, in the central business district of Kampala, Uganda's capital and largest city. The coordinates of the main office of UACC are:0°02'42.0"N, 32°26'35.0"E (Latitude:0.0445000; Longitude:32.443056).

History
The airline was established in 1994 by Act of the Ugandan Parliament, to "provide and operate safe, efficient, adequate, economical and properly coordinated air transport services within and outside the country, for cargo, passenger, chartered passenger flights, air mail services and flight training".

For most of its life, the company has owned one aircraft, a Lockheed C-130 Hercules, registration number 5X-UCF. In October 2009, the fleet was expanded by the addition of two Harbin Y-12 turboprop aircraft. Operations were expanded to include passenger charter services within Uganda and to countries in Eastern Africa, Central Africa and Southern Africa.

Destinations
 Uganda Air Cargo services the following destinations:

Fleet
As of June 2022, the fleet of UACC comprises the following aircraft.

References

External links
 Uganda Air Cargo Homepage

Airlines of Uganda
Airlines established in 1994
1994 establishments in Uganda
Organisations based in Entebbe
Government-owned airlines
Government-owned companies of Uganda